Heather Mitts Feeley (born Heather Blaine Mitts; June 9, 1978) is an American former professional soccer defender. Mitts played college soccer for the University of Florida, and thereafter, she played professionally in the Women's Professional Soccer (WPS) league; for the Philadelphia Charge, Boston Breakers, Philadelphia Independence and Atlanta Beat.  She is a three-time Olympic gold medalist, and was a member of the U.S. women's national team.  She played in four matches in the 2011 FIFA Women's World Cup, where the U.S. national team finished second. Mitts announced her retirement from soccer via Twitter on March 13, 2013.

Early life
Mitts was born in Cincinnati, Ohio, on June 9, 1978, and began playing soccer at the age of six. From 1993 to 1996, she attended St. Ursula Academy in Cincinnati, where she played high school soccer and helped the team tally a 70-5-1 record during her time with the team. During her freshman season, the team won the state title. During her junior and senior years, Mitts earned all-state honors.

University of Florida Gators
Mitts received an athletic scholarship to attend the University of Florida in Gainesville, Florida, and played for coach Becky Burleigh's Florida Gators women's soccer team in National Collegiate Athletic Association (NCAA) competition from 1996 to 1999. Mitts was part of the defensive line that helped the Gators win their first-ever NCAA Women's Soccer Championship in 1998. She was named a third-team All-American in 1998 and a first-team All-American in 1999, and became the Gators' all-time record holder in appearances (95), starts (94), and minutes played (7,547).  She graduated from the University of Florida with a bachelor's degree in advertising in 2000.  She was inducted into the University of Florida Athletic Hall of Fame as a "Gator Great" in 2013.

Club career

Tampa Bay Extreme, 2000

Straight out of college, Mitts played for Tampa Bay Extreme of W-League in 2000 while waiting for the launch of the new Women's United Soccer Association league.

Philadelphia Charge, 2001-03
Upon the WUSA's launch and inaugural season in 2001, Mitts was drafted to the Philadelphia Charge.  With the club, she appeared in twenty games (1,751 minutes) in the inaugural season and added two assists.  Throughout her Charge career, Mitts appeared in fifty-one games (4,414 minutes) and recorded eight assists over three seasons.  She was named as a WUSA All-Star in 2003.  Unfortunately, after the 2003 season, the WUSA ceased operations.

Central Florida Krush, 2005
Mitts returned to the W-League in 2005, playing sparingly for Central Florida Krush while splitting her time between the United States Women's National Team. She appeared in four games (360 minutes).

WPS Years, 2009–11

Upon the introduction of Women's Professional Soccer, Mitts and fellow USWNT players Angela Hucles and Kristine Lilly were allocated to the Boston Breakers on September 16, 2008. In the inaugural 2009 Women's Professional Soccer season, Mitts appeared in nineteen games (all starts, 1,631 minutes) and added an assist.  After the season, the Boston Breakers declared Mitts a free agent.

On October 14, 2009, Mitts signed with 2010 WPS expansion team Philadelphia Independence, marking her return to play professional soccer in Philadelphia following the demise of the WUSA's Philadelphia Charge.

In January 2011, Mitts signed with the Atlanta Beat and played right defensive back during the 2011 season.

NWSL, 2013

In 2013, Mitts was allocated to the Boston Breakers in the new National Women's Soccer League; however, she retired before the start of the season.

International career
Mitts is a three-time Olympic gold medalist as a member of the U.S. National Women's team in the 2004, 2008, and  2012 Summer Olympics winning gold in all three Olympics. She has also represented the United States in over 100 international matches.  She was also a member of the U.S. national team who finished second in the 2006 Algarve Cup.

On May 12, 2007, Mitts tore her anterior cruciate ligament (ACL) in an international friendly match with Canada.  The injury put Mitts out of contention for the 2007 FIFA Women's World Cup.

On May 9, 2011, Mitts was named to the U.S. roster for the 2011 FIFA Women's World Cup tournament in Germany. She was on the United States women's soccer team roster for the 2012 London Olympics, and played all 90 minutes of the match against Colombia in group stage.

On March 13, 2013, Mitts officially announced her retirement from the national team as well as the Breakers.  She serves as a sideline reporter for Philadelphia Union games and has become a team ambassador.

Career statistics

International goals
Mitts scored 2 goals in international matches, which are both game winners.

Personal life
Mitts has held a number of television commentary jobs. She has served as a studio soccer analyst for ABC, ESPN and ESPN2 during the 2003 FIFA Women's World Cup and was a sideline reporter for several MLS broadcasts in 2005. In addition to broadcasting soccer, she also was a sideline reporter for American college football during fall 2005 for ESPN.

Mitts married NFL quarterback A. J. Feeley in February 2010. They have a son born in 2014, a daughter born in 2016, and a son born in 2018.

Mitts runs a soccer camp every year throughout the United States in which she teaches the basics of soccer including: dribbling, juggling, foot-skills, passing, receiving.  These are one-day soccer camps that teach children to grasp the fundamentals of soccer and allow them to continue their growth and understanding of the sport.

Honors
 CONCACAF Women's Olympic Qualifying Tournament: 2008, 2012
CONCACAF Women's Championship: 2006
 Olympic Gold Medal: 2004,  2008, 2012

See also

 All-time Boston Breakers (WPS) roster
 List of ESPN Major League Soccer personalities
 List of multiple Olympic gold medalists in one event
 List of Olympic medalists in football
 List of Philadelphia Union broadcasters
 List of University of Florida alumni
 List of University of Florida Olympians
List of University of Florida Athletic Hall of Fame members

References

Further reading
 Grainey, Timothy (2012), Beyond Bend It Like Beckham: The Global Phenomenon of Women's Soccer, University of Nebraska Press, 
 Kassouf, Jeff (2011), Girls Play to Win Soccer, Norwood House Press, 
 Lisi, Clemente A. (2010), The U.S. Women's Soccer Team: An American Success Story, Scarecrow Press, 
 Longman, Jere (2009), The Girls of Summer: The U.S. Women's Soccer Team and How it Changed the World, HarperCollins, 
 Stevens, Dakota (2011), A Look at the Women's Professional Soccer Including the Soccer Associations, Teams, Players, Awards, and More, BiblioBazaar,

External links

 
 
 US Soccer player profile
 WUSA player profile (archive)

1978 births
Living people
American women's soccer players
Women's association football central defenders
Women's association football fullbacks
Atlanta Beat (WPS) players
Boston Breakers players
FIFA Century Club
Florida Gators women's soccer players
Footballers at the 2004 Summer Olympics
Footballers at the 2008 Summer Olympics
Footballers at the 2012 Summer Olympics
Olympic gold medalists for the United States in soccer
Soccer players from Cincinnati
Philadelphia Charge players
Philadelphia Independence players
United States women's international soccer players
Washington Freedom players
2011 FIFA Women's World Cup players
USL W-League (1995–2015) players
Medalists at the 2012 Summer Olympics
Medalists at the 2008 Summer Olympics
Medalists at the 2004 Summer Olympics
Major League Soccer broadcasters
Women association football commentators
Women's United Soccer Association players
Warrington College of Business alumni
Women's Professional Soccer players